Phaeobalia is a genus of flies in the family Empididae.

Species
P. brevitibia (Melander, 1928)
P. dimidiata (Loew, 1869)
P. elapha (Vaillant, 1968)
P. elongata (Wagner, 1982)
P. inermis (Loew, 1861)
P. lecta (Melander, 1902)
P. lynebrgi (Vaillant & Chvála, 1973)
P. maculata (Vaillant, 1964)
P. montana (Vaillant, 1973)
P. orophila (Vaillant, 1973)
P. peniscissa (Becker, 1889)
P. pokornyi Mik, 1886
P. ramosa (Vaillant, 1964)
P. tetrastyla (Vaillant, 1973)
P. trinotata (Mik, 1869)
P. vaillanti (Wagner, 1982)
P. varipennis (Nowicki, 1868)
P. zwicki (Vaillant & Vincon, 1987)

References

Empidoidea genera
Empididae